Prolixicheilus longisulcus is a species of fish in the family Cyprinidae, found in streams belonging to the Zuojiang River, a tributary of Pearl River in China. This species is the only member of its genus.

References

Labeoninae
Monotypic ray-finned fish genera
Cyprinidae genera
Cyprinid fish of Asia
Fish of China